Alén may refer to:

Alén (name)
Monte Alén National Park, Equatorial Guinea